Maria Elena Alexander is an American writer of horror and dark fantasy stories and poetry, best known for her award-winning novels Mr. Wicker and Snowed.

Background and early career
Alexander was born in Hayward, California. She first started writing at the age of eight: she contracted chicken pox and was forced to stay home with nothing to occupy her, so she began to create stories. She attended Ponderosa High School, and earned a bachelor's degree in English from California State University, Sacramento.

Alexander's career as a professional storyteller began in 1988, when she co-founded Dead Earth Productions, a horror Live Action Role-Playing company in the San Francisco Bay Area. She was Dead Earth's Lead Writer from 1989–1996.

Alexander entered the world of online game writing in 1994, when she became World Designer and In-World Storyteller for Fujitsu America's WorldsAway project, one of the first graphical virtual worlds. Working under Randy Farmer, she created the history, mythology, and cohesive storyline for the Dreamscape.

In 1997, Alexander began a film mentorship under Clive Barker and moved to Los Angeles. Her screenplays were subsequently quarterfinalists for the Austin Film Festival in 1998 and 1999, and the Nicholl Fellowship in 1999.

Film and Fiction
In 2000, Alexander turned to short stories and poetry. Her work has appeared in Paradox Magazine,  Chiaroscuro Magazine, Gothic.net, and assorted anthologies, and has been nominated for multiple awards. She has also published numerous nonfiction articles, including essays on Douglas Adams and George R.R. Martin.

In 2014, Alexander's debut novel, Mr. Wicker, won the 2014 Bram Stoker Award for Superior Achievement in a First Novel,. Her next book, a young adult novel entitled Snowed, won the 2016 Bram Stoker Award for Superior Achievement in a Young Adult Novel and was nominated for the 2017 Anthony Award for Best Children's/YA Novel. Snowbound, the sequel to Snowed and the second book in a planned trilogy, was published in September 2018.

Personal life
Alexander lives in Los Angeles, California, where, in addition to writing, she pursues her passion of sword fighting. She has studied Shinkendo, tameshigiri, stage combat, and the European small sword, and appeared in a special issue of Katsujinken Magazine entitled "Women of the Sword Arts." She has also written articles criticizing unrealistic portrayals of sword handling in art, fiction, and film, which has led to some controversy.

Alexander's hands have become temporarily disabled at times, but she has been able to continue to write using speech recognition technology.

Nominations and awards

Bibliography

Novels
 Snowblind (2020)
 Snowbound (2018)
 Snowed (2016)
 Mr. Wicker (2014)

Collections and Anthologies
 12 Tales Lie: 1 Tells True (2019)
 By the Pricking: 5 Dark Tales of Passion and Perversion (2013)
 At Louche Ends: Poetry for the Decadent, the Damned & the Absinthe-Minded (2011)
 Left Hanging: 9 Tales of Suspense and Thrills (2011)
 Sins of the Sirens (2008)
 Biting Midnight: A Feast of Darksome Verse (2002)

Short fiction
 "Neighborhood Watchers" (2017)
 "Hey, Little Sister" (2016)
 "Some Divine" (2015)
 "Harvest of Flames" (2014)
 "Revivified" (2012)
 "Nickelback Ned" (2011)
 "Saturnalia" (2011)
 "Though Thy Lips Are Pale" (2009)
 "In Her Mirrors, Dimly" (2008)
 "The Last Word" (2008)
 "Pinned" (2008)
 "This Body of Death" (2005)
 "Veil of Skin" (2005)
 "The Dark River in His Flesh" (2004)
 "Conspiracy of One" (2004)
 "Agnus Dei" (2003)
 "Unholywood" aka "Samantha Blazes: Psychic Detective of LA" (2003)
 "Some Divine" (2002)
 "The King of Shadows" (2001)
 "When Gods Die" (2001)
 "Bacchus Anesti" (2000)
 "Coming Home" (2000)
 "Black Roses and Hail Marys" (2000)

Nonfiction
 "The Late, Great Halloween Costume Massacre" (2017)
 "George R.R. Martin: The Man Who Put Horror in Every Home" (2017)
 "The Witches of Winter" (2016)
 "Four of the Dumbest Things Done with Swords in Fiction and Film" (2014)
 "Baby Got Backbone: What Makes Strong Women Kick in Horror Films and TV Shows" (2014)
 "Five Things I Learned Writing Mr. Wicker" (2014)
 "What You See Is Who You Get: POV in Script-To-Book Adaptations" (2014)
 "Why I Hate (Most) Photos and Drawings of Women With Swords" (2013)
 "Me, Masturbation & Clive Barker" (2013)
 "The Greatest Story Ever Interacted With" (2012)
 "10 Reasons You HATE Poetry" (2012)
 "Twilight Merch Update: XXX Edition" (2010)
 "Dogma, Darth Vader and My Sexual Awakening" (2009)
 "Rendezvous and Retail in French BDSM" (2007)
 "Liberte, Egalite, Sexualite — French Philosophy and BDSM Culture" (2007)
 "Susan Pevensie" (2006)
 "Goodnight, Marvin" (2005)
 "Bloody Awful Poetry: Why It's So Easy to Write Bad Love Poetry" (2002)
 "Modern Madness" (1995)
 "The Psyberpsychology of Insanity" (1994)
 "Unscripted Theater: Guidelines for Running Cross-Genre, Live-Action Games, Dead Earth Productions" (1994)
 "Graphology" (1992)

References

External links 
 Official website

Living people
American fiction writers
21st-century American women writers
American women novelists
21st-century American novelists
American women short story writers
21st-century American short story writers
Urban fantasy writers
Writers of Gothic fiction
Women science fiction and fantasy writers
American horror novelists
American fantasy writers
American mystery novelists
American thriller writers
Women writers of young adult literature
American young adult novelists
American women poets
Year of birth missing (living people)